The Butler Bulldogs men's basketball team represents Butler University in Indianapolis, Indiana. The school's team currently competes in the Big East Conference. They play their home games at Hinkle Fieldhouse.

History

Butler competed as part of the Horizon League since its founding, and played basketball in other regional conferences before that, including the Missouri Valley Conference. In 2012 they left the Horizon League for the Atlantic 10 and the year after, moved to the Big East.

Despite having played in a mid-major conference, Butler rose to national prominence in the late 1990s. They ranked in most media polls for all but a few weeks from the 2006–07 season to the 2011–12 season, and competed in the postseason every year since 1997, except for 2004, 2005, and 2014. In the 2010 NCAA tournament, Butler was the National runner-up to Duke, advancing to the National Championship Game after defeating Michigan State in the Final Four. With a total enrollment of only 4,500 students, Butler is the smallest school to play for a national championship since the tournament expanded to 64 teams in 1985.  The Bulldogs also went to the championship game in the following NCAA tournament, falling to UConn after defeating VCU in the Final Four. With the victory over VCU, Butler became the first mid-major program to reach the championship game in successive seasons since 1979, when seeding of the tournament began, and the only team from the state of Indiana to reach back-to-back championship games. The Bulldogs also won the National Championship in 1927, though it was before March Madness so it does not count for NCAA records.

After spending one season in the Atlantic 10 Conference, Butler moved into the realigned basketball-only Big East Conference for the 2013–14 season. Their first season was mediocre, finishing 9th out of 10 teams with a 14–17 record, their first losing record since 2004–05. In their second season, despite being picked to finish 7th, the Bulldogs surprised many by finishing tied for second place in the conference. Butler finished the 2015–16 season in a tie for fourth place in Big East play with a record of 21–11, 10–8 in conference and receiving a bid to the NCAA tournament where they advanced to the Second Round.

Basketball community
Because of the school's history of basketball success, location in the heart of the land of "Hoosier Hysteria", and lack of a scholarship football program, the Butler University fan base is primarily basketball-oriented. Other athletics enjoy substantial followings of current students and alumni, but only basketball has garnered interest from a national audience.

Two studies estimated that television, print, and online news coverage of Butler's 2010 and 2011 appearances in the NCAA tournament championship game resulted in additional publicity for the university worth about $1.2 billion. In an example of the "Flutie effect", applications rose by 41% after the 2010 appearance. In June 2011, USA Today ranked Butler as one of the top five colleges making use of social media. Specific to basketball, Butler's mascot, Butler Blue, the men's basketball program, head coach LaVall Jordan, and other coaches have university-endorsed Twitter accounts.  Also, online communities Butler Hoops and /r/ButlerUniversity exist to facilitate discussion among fans. In 2013, a student-run podcast, called the "Front Row Hoopcast," was started to give commentary and insight to Butler Basketball from the student perspective.

In recent years, the Butler program has also received national attention for its philosophy to the game, which it calls "The Butler Way". At its core, The Butler Way calls for complete commitment and exalts teamwork above self.

Postseason

NCAA tournament results
The Bulldogs have appeared in 16 NCAA Tournaments. Their combined record is 24–16.
 
 
*Following the introduction of the "First Four" round in 2011, the Round of 64 and Round of 32 were referred to as the Second Round and Third Round, respectively, from 2011 to 2015. Then from 2016 moving forward, the Round 64 and Round of 32 will be called the First and Second rounds, as they were prior to 2011.

NIT results
The Bulldogs have appeared in nine National Invitation Tournaments. Their combined record is 5–9.

CBI results
The Bulldogs have appeared in one College Basketball Invitational. Their record is 2–1.

Bulldogs in the NBA
NBA & ABA players who attended Butler University

 Bob Evans – drafted in the 4th round by the Indianapolis Olympians in the 1949 NBA draft
 Gordon Hayward – drafted 9th overall by the Utah Jazz in the 2010 NBA draft. Currently playing for the Charlotte Hornets.
 Shelvin Mack – drafted in the 2nd round by the Washington Wizards in the 2011 NBA draft. 
 Sean McDermott – Signed as a free agent with the Memphis Grizzlies in 2020–21
 Kelan Martin – Signed as a free agent with the Minnesota Timberwolves in 2019–20. Signed with the Indiana Pacers for the 2020-2021 season.
 Ralph O'Brien – drafted in the 6th round by the Indianapolis Olympians in the 1950 NBA draft
 Billy Shepherd – drafted by Virginia Squires (ABA) in 1972
 Jerry Steiner – Signed as a free agent with the Indianapolis Kautskys in 1940–41 and the Fort Wayne Zollner Pistons in 1946–47

Bulldogs in the NBA G League

Kamar Baldwin, player in the NBA G League
Sean_McDermott_(basketball), player in the NBA G League

Bulldogs in international leagues

Tyler Wideman, player in the Israeli National League

Coaching history

Awards

Naismith Memorial Basketball Hall of Fame
 Harlan Page – 1962
 Tony Hinkle – 1965

National Collegiate Basketball Hall of Fame
 Tony Hinkle – 2006
 Harlan Page – 2006

National Coach of the Year
 Todd Lickliter – 2007

All-Americans
 H. W. Middlesworth – 1924
 Frank Baird – 1934
 Jerry Steiner – 1940
 Bob Dietz – 1941
 Ralph "Buckshot" O'Brien – 1950 
 Jimmy Doyle – 1950
 Ted Guzek – 1957
 Billy Shepherd – 1971
 Chad Tucker* – 1985
 A. J. Graves* – 2007
 Mike Green* – 2008
 Matt Howard* – 2009
 Gordon Hayward* – 2010
 Kelan Martin* – 2018

(*) Denotes Honorable Mention

Academic All-Americans
 Chris Miskel – 1995***
 A. J. Graves – 2007*, 2008**
 Drew Streicher – 2008***
 Matt Howard – 2009**, 2010*, 2011*
 Gordon Hayward – 2010***
 Ronald Nored – 2012**
 Andrew Smith – 2013**
 Alex Barlow – 2015**

(*) Denotes 1st team 
(**) Denotes 2nd team 
(***) Denotes 3rd team

Academic All-American of the Year
 Matt Howard – 2011

McDonald's All-American
 Tyler Lewis – 2012

Senior Class Award
 Alex Barlow – 2015

Big East Coach of the Year
 Chris Holtmann – 2017

Horizon League Player of the Year
 Darin Archibold – 1991
 Jon Neuhouser – 1997
 Rylan Hainje – 2002
 Brandon Polk – 2006
 Mike Green – 2008
 Matt Howard – 2009
 Gordon Hayward – 2010

Horizon League Coach of the Year
 Joe Sexson – 1984
 Barry Collier – 1991, 1997, 1999, 2000
 Thad Matta – 2001
 Todd Lickliter – 2005, 2007
 Brad Stevens – 2009, 2010

Indiana Collegiate Conference Player of the Year
 Tom Bowman – 1962
 Wayne Burris – 1977
 Tom Orner – 1978

Indiana Collegiate Conference Coach of the Year
 Tony Hinkle – 1956, 1961, 1962
 George Theofanis – 1973, 1977
 Joe Sexson – 1978

MAC Most Valuable Player
 Ralph "Buckshot" O'Brien – 1949

Information on the awards comes from the 2009–2010 media guide.

Record
See List of Butler Bulldogs men's basketball seasons

Record vs. Big East opponents
 Connecticut: 0–7
 Creighton: 11–16
 DePaul: 19–7
 Georgetown: 11–11
 Marquette: 23–24
 Providence: 5–18
 Seton Hall: 10–12
 St. John's: 11–11
 Villanova: 6–16
 Xavier: 25–45
Source

All-time leading scorers 

Sources of information

Tournament titles

References

External links